NGC 1721 is a lenticular galaxy (S0) located in the constellation Eridanus. It was discovered on the 10th of Nov 1885 by Edward Emerson Barnard. This galaxy is a member of the NGC 1723 Group—consisting of NCG 1723 (the brightest member, 11.7-mag) and a close triplet of NGC 1721, NGC 1725 and NGC 1728.

NGC 1721 is a Dreyer Object (a now archaic astronomical term), meaning that it was included in the original New General Catalogue by JLE Dreyer.

References

External links 
 

Eridanus (constellation)
Lenticular galaxies
1721
016484